Almirantazgo Fjord, also known as Almirantazgo Sound or Admiralty Sound, is a Chilean fjord located in the far south of the country at .   The fjord cuts deeply into the west coast of the Isla Grande de Tierra del Fuego, extending southeastwards from the Whiteside Channel, which separates Isla Grande from Dawson Island.  On its south side several smaller fjords and bays make significant indentations into the north coastline of the Cordillera Darwin. One of these, Ainsworth Bay, is home to a colony of elephant seals. Azopardo River empties into the head of the fjord.

The sound was discovered in 1827 by the British Captain Phillip Parker King and named after the British Admiralty.

Geography
Ainsworth Bay, fed by the meltwater of Marinelli Glacier is a notable inlet along the Almirantazgo Fjord. The Marinelli Glacier has been in a state of retreat since at least 1960, and the retreat continues to the present time of 2008.

See also
 Marinelli Creek

References

Fjords of Chile
Bodies of water of Magallanes Region
Isla Grande de Tierra del Fuego